Uwe Neuhaus (born 26 November 1959) is a German retired football player and manager who last managed Arminia Bielefeld.

Coaching career

1995–2006: Early career
Neuhaus was head coach of Wattenscheid 09 II from November 1995 to June 1996 and VfB Hüls from October 1997 to June 1998. Neuhaus had a stint as assistant coach at Borussia Dortmund from July 1998 until he became head coach of Borussia Dortmund II in June 2004. He was there until he became head coach of Rot-Weiss Essen in April 2005. Rot-Weiss Essen sacked Neuhaus in November 2006.

2007–2014: Union Berlin
Neuhaus was head coach of Union Berlin between 1 July 2007 and 30 June 2014.

2015–2018: Dynamo Dresden
On 10 April 2015 he was named the new head coach of Dynamo Dresden. He was sacked on 22 August 2018.

2018–present: Arminia Bielefeld
On 10 December 2018, Neuhaus was appointed new head coach of Arminia Bielefeld. He was sacked on 1 March 2021.

Managerial statistics

Honours

Manager
Manager
 2. Bundesliga: (II)
Champions: 2019-2020

Individual
 3. Liga Manager of the Year: 2015–16

References

External links

1959 births
Living people
German footballers
German football managers
Rot-Weiss Essen players
SG Wattenscheid 09 players
1. FC Union Berlin managers
VfB Remscheid players
Bundesliga players
2. Bundesliga players
Rot-Weiss Essen managers
2. Bundesliga managers
Dynamo Dresden managers
Arminia Bielefeld managers
SpVgg Erkenschwick players
3. Liga managers
Borussia Dortmund II managers
VfB Hüls managers
Association football midfielders
Oberliga (football) players
Footballers from North Rhine-Westphalia
West German footballers